The 2008 Trinidad and Tobago Pro Bowl was the fifth season of the Courts Pro Bowl, which is a knockout tournament competition for teams in the TT Pro League. W Connection entered as the tournament's defending champion. The tournament commenced on 6 May, with 10 teams competing in single elimination matches and concluded on 23 May, with Caledonia AIA defeating Defence Force 2–0 to claim the title.

Qualification
Every club from the TT Pro League automatically qualified for the competition. Seeding was determined by the league standings following the fourth match day of the 2008 season. Teams ranked seventh to tenth were placed directly into the qualifying round which determined the seventh and eight spots in the quarterfinals.

The automatic quarterfinal qualifiers in order of league position were: Caledonia AIA, W Connection, San Juan Jabloteh, United Petrotrin, Joe Public, and Defence Force.

Schedule
The schedule for the 2008 Courts Pro Bowl, as announced by the TT Pro League:

Bracket

Results
All matches were played for 90 minutes duration, at the end of which if the match was still tied, penalty-kicks were used to determine the match winner.

Qualifying round
In the qualifying round, St. Ann's Rangers defeated Tobago United 3–1, whereas North East Stars upended Ma Pau 1–0 to advance to the quarterfinals.

Quarterfinals
Caledonia AIA and W Connection met little resistance from St. Ann's Rangers and North East Stars respectively. However, Defence Force upset San Juan Jabloteh 5–4 on penalties after the match ended 1–1 in regulation. United Petrotrin advanced to the semifinals after they beat Joe Public with the lone goal from Beville Joseph.

Semifinals
On 16 May, Caledonia AIA needed penalty kicks to defeat United Petrotrin 4–2. In addition, Defence Force continued their run through the competition with a 2–0 upset win over W Connection.

Final
In the final on 23 May, Caledonia AIA claimed the title over Defence Force following a quick goal from Kendall Velox in the 6th minute and an own goal by Corey Rivers a minute before half-time. Using a double in W Connection's win over North East Stars, Oscar Velasco-Torijano was the tournament's leading goal scorer.

References

External links
Official Website

2008 Courts Pro Bowl
Pro Bowl